Bowling Green State Falcons basketball may refer to either of the basketball teams that represent the Bowling Green State University:
Bowling Green Falcons men's basketball
Bowling Green Falcons women's basketball